Gobosh Aviation was an American aircraft manufacturer based in Moline, Illinois. The company specialized in light-sport aircraft for the American domestic market. The company's first product was the Gobosh 700S, introduced in 2007. This was joined by the Gobosh 800XP in 2008.

The company name means "Go Big Or Stay Home".

By 2016 the company website had been taken down and the company had likely gone out of business.

Aircraft

References

External links
Official website archives on Archive.org

Defunct aircraft manufacturers of the United States